
Ganesh Himāl is a sub-range of the Himalayas located mostly in north-central Nepal, but some peaks lie on the border with Tibet. The Trisuli Gandaki valley on the east separates it from the Langtang Himal; the 
Budhi (Buri) Gandaki valley and the Shyar Khola valley on the west separate it from the Sringi Himal and the Mansiri Himal (home of Manaslu, the nearest 8000m peak). The range lies about 70 km north-northwest of Kathmandu.

The highest peak in the range is Yangra (Ganesh I), 7,422 m (24,350 ft).  There are three other peaks over 7000 metres plus some fourteen others over 6000 metres. Ganesh Himal enjoys great vertical relief over nearby valleys, particularly Ganesh NW (see below), being closest to the Shyar Khola.

The name for the range comes from the Hindu deity Ganesha, usually depicted in the form of an elephant. In fact, the south face of Pabil (Ganesh IV) slightly resembles an elephant, with a ridge that is reminiscent of an elephant's trunk.

Names and elevations for this range differ from source to source; see the notes below the table. The least ambiguous way to refer to the different peaks would be "Ganesh NW", etc., but this is not the standard practice in the literature for this range.

First ascent of Ganesh I happened on October 6th, 1955. Summit group was conformed by famous guide Raymond Lambert, Pierre Vittoz, Eric Gauchar, all of them Swiss, and French Mme. Claude Kogan.

Highest peaks

Gallery

Notes
  The names Ganesh II, Salasungo (Ganesh III), and Pabil (Ganesh IV) are from the Finnmap They do not agree with other, older sources such as Carter or Neate (which is derived from Carter). Ohmori attests the name "Lapsang Karbo" for the southeast peak, here called Salasungo.
  Heights are from the Finnmap. 
  Coordinates have been derived from the Finnmap by Eberhard Jurgalski.
  Prominence values (except for Yangra) have been derived from the Finnmap by Eberhard Jurgalski. For Yangra, the value is from peaklist.org.
 Location Dhading

References

External links 
Himalayan Index
DEM files for the Himalaya (Corrected versions of SRTM data)
Pictures of ganesh himal

Mountain ranges of the Himalayas
Mountain ranges of Nepal
Mountain ranges of Tibet
Mountains of the Bagmati Province